Hans Ortner is an Austrian sprint canoer who competed in the early 1950s. He won a bronze medal in the K-4 1000 m at the 1950 ICF Canoe Sprint World Championships in Copenhagen.

References

Austrian male canoeists
Possibly living people
Year of birth missing
ICF Canoe Sprint World Championships medalists in kayak